The Province of Rieti is a province in the Lazio region of Italy. Its capital is the city of Rieti. There are 73 comuni in the province.

Geography
A large part of its territory corresponds to the historical-geographical region of Sabina. Rieti is located in the north-east Lazio. It is bordered to the west, along the river Tiber by the Province of Viterbo and to the south-west by the Metropolitan City of Rome Capital. It is also bordered by the regions of Umbria to the north and by Marche to the east. 

The province is largely mountainous with the Monti della Duchessa and the Monti del Cicolano ranges in the south with Monte Nuria and Monte Giano, the Monti Reatini range with Monte Terminillo (2217 m) in the north in part of the Abruzzese Apennines, and Monti della Laga (2458 m) to the east on the border with Abruzzo. Of particular importance are the two artificial lakes in the Valle del Salto: Lago del Salto and Lago del Turano, both created during the Fascist period.

There are several protected areas in the province. To the south lies the Parco regionale naturale dei Monti Lucretili, to the southeast the Riserva regionale Montagne della Duchessa,  and a small part of the Parco regionale naturale del Sirente - Velino. Between the two areas is the Riserva naturale Monte Navegna e Monte Cervia (between the lakes of Salto and Turano. In the east, in the Monti della Laga range is the Parco Nazionale del Gran Sasso e Monti della Laga. Also of note is the Riserva parziale naturale dei Laghi Lungo e Ripasottile on the Rieti plain, and the Riserva naturale di Nazzano, Tevere-Farfa to the west. Riserva parziale naturale dei Laghi Lungo e Ripasottile contains the lakes of Lungo and Ripasottile, which support a diversity of wildlife, particularly birds such as herons and little grebes. There are numerous natural oases, castles, fortresses and Franciscan sanctuaries dotted about Rieti Province.

See also 
 Sabina (region)

References

External links

Official website

 
Rieti
States and territories established in 1927